Franscisco Jiménez Rubio was a Nicaraguan Conservative politician. He served as acting Head of State in Nicaragua from 12 January 1838 – 13 March 1838 while it was a part of the Federal Republic of Central America. He oversaw the next election of Head of State and was succeeded by José Núñez.

References 

Conservative Party (Nicaragua) politicians